WTD is World Toilet Day.

WTD may also refer to:
 Watch the Duck, an American band
 White Trash Debutantes, an American rock band
 Working Time Directive, a directive of the European Union
 World Theatre Day
 West End Airport's IATA code
 Watertable depth, the depth of the upper surface of the zone of water saturation in the ground (see also water table). 
 World Teachers Day